was a Japanese manga artist. He specialized in manga with ecological messages. His most famous manga was Fisherman Sanpei which won the Kodansha Children's Manga Award in 1974.

References

Manga artists from Akita Prefecture
1939 births
2020 deaths
Deaths from cancer in Japan
Deaths from pancreatic cancer